Goldberg-Mildenitz is an Amt in the Ludwigslust-Parchim district, in Mecklenburg-Vorpommern, Germany. The seat of the Amt is in Goldberg.

The Amt Goldberg-Mildenitz consists of the following municipalities:
Dobbertin
Goldberg
Mestlin
Neu Poserin
Techentin
Wendisch Waren

Ämter in Mecklenburg-Western Pomerania